HMIS Ahmedabad (T 264) was a Basset-class trawler that was part of the Royal Indian Navy. The ship was laid down in Bombay by Scindia Steam Navigation Co Ltd in 1941 and was launched in 1943. She was under the command of Lieutenant Robert Love of the Royal Indian Naval Reserve from the 14th April 1944 until early 1945, when he was replaced by Lieutenant Hosi Behramji Dubash of the Royal Indian Naval Volunteer Reserve Ahmedabad was an anti-submarine trawler. One of the journeys that the ship made was during a cyclone in 1945 on the Indian east coast from Visakhapatnam to search for a landing craft tank (LCT) but in Coconda, Ahmedabad grounded and had to be salvaged.

References 

Ships of India
1943 ships